The Mons International Film Festival (FIFA) is an annual film festival held in Mons, Belgium. It was launched in 1984 by Elio Di Rupo and has been held every year in February. The film voted by a jury as the best in the competition section receives the Grand Prize.

References

External links
 
 

Film festivals in Belgium
Film festivals established in 1984
Winter events in Belgium
1984 establishments in Belgium